Mount Sonder, or Rwetyepme, its Aboriginal name, is the fourth highest mountain in the Northern Territory, Australia at  .

Location and features

It marks one end of the celebrated Larapinta trail, which extends  to Alice Springs. The shape of the mountain is a double peak, the relative heights of which are somewhat ambiguous from the summit, although easy to identify from the surrounding plains. The mountain can be seen from the western half of the Larapinta trail, up to Ormiston Pound, which obscures it from then on.

Explorer Ernest Giles named the mountain in honour of German botanist Dr. Otto Wilhelm Sonder.

Water is available from a tank  beyond the carpark, and there is a direction plate at the summit. The view from the top boasts the taller Mount Zeil to the west, the West MacDonnell Range to the east, Glen Helen, a nearby resort, to the east and Gosses Bluff to the south-west.

See also

List of mountains of Australia

References

Sonder